Samriddhi, a word which means prosperity in English, is an annual student-run business conference that takes place at the Goa Institute of Management, India. One of the largest Business School Conferences, it is a three-day event that features prominent speakers and participants from colleges all over India.

The main event during Samriddhi is the business conference, where speakers from diverse business backgrounds and interests come together and speak about topics related to the theme of that year's conference. Other events also that take place during the course of the three-day conference include quizzes, case studies, and a photography competition.

2012 
The theme for the year 2012 was "The Business of Innovation". Speakers from varying backgrounds came together to speak about their fields of work and explain to students how they brought about innovation.  Speakers this year included, amongst others, the Governor of Goa H.E. Bharat Vir Wanchoo, Alyque Padamsee (Actor and Ad Guru), Kumar Ankit (Co-founder & Executive Director at Green Leaf Energy Private Limited), Stephen Remedios (Former Head Customer Marketing, HUL), and Mithileshwar Jha (Professor Marketing at the Indian Institute of Management Bangalore).

The topics ranged from Film making to the Advertising to Business Logistics. In addition to the Business Conference, on the second and third days of the conference, various educational and entertaining events were held for students from Business schools all across India.

Speakers for 2012 
 H.E. Bharat Vir Wanchoo, Governor of Goa
 Alyque Padamsee
 S L Ganapathi
 Stephen Remedios
 Commodore Srikant Kesnur
 Captain Praveen Nair
 Devdutt Modak
 Kumar Ankit

References

Related External Links
 "India can be the brainbox of the world, says Alyque Padamsee"
 "India emerging as economic power"
 "Simple things can change the world"
 "I Have no religion"
 "India can be the brainbox of the world"
 "Samriddhi 2012 Kicks Off in Goa"
 "https://archive.today/20130118123736/http://www.beyondplus2.com/news_details-Aug_13_2012-1511.htm"
 "India emerging as economic power"

 www.gim.ac.in

Business conferences in India